Wembley's Parliament of Living Religions was part of the British Empire Exhibition of 1924, inviting famous representatives of important living religions within the British Empire. Although the exhibition was held at Wembley Park in north-west London the conference was held at the Imperial Institute, between 22 September and 3 October 1924.

The tradition of this and similar World Fairs go back to the early 18th century. Some of the more famous ones have been The Great Exhibition of 1851 in London and  Parliament of the World's Religions in Chicago in 1893.

Religions (not) presented 
William Loftus Hare (1868-1943), at the time Director of Studies in Comparative Religion and Philosophy to the Theosophical Society, wrote:

"Christianity and Judaism were excluded from our plan for several sufficient reasons – not because, as some critic had not very seriously suggested, we considered them to be‚ no longer living religions. To have attempted to include the Christian faith in a short conference of single sessions would have involved many difficulties, the first being the invidious choice of expositors. We could not have pleased everybody. Secondly, we should have been instructing the already instructed. Thirdly, it would have been something of an impertinence for us to set up a new pulpit amid the thousands to which people may resort already. In lesser degree the same arguments apply to Judaism, which in its main Biblical features, is very familiar. We had of course, no anti-Christian bias nor had any of our expositors, except in the most formal sense. Practically, the English and the Christian received and returned the utmost friendliness. We placed Hinduism first on our program for various reasons which are apparent. Two hundred and seventeen millions of our fellow citizens deserved more than one lecture and would have had more if our time for preparation had been extended."

Main participants and religious representatives
Mirza Bashir-ud-Din Mahmud Ahmad (Islam)
Sir Francis Young-Husband
Pandit Shyam Shankar
Al-Haj Khwaja Kamal-ud-Din
Mustafa Khan
Sheikh Kahdim El Dojaily
Sufi Hafiz Raushan Ali
Dr. W.A. de Silva
Mr. G.P. Malalasekera
Mr. Shoson Miyamoto
Shams-ul-Ulema Dastur Kaikobad Adarbad Noshirvan
Rai Bahadur Jagmander Lal Jaini
Sardar Kahan Singh
Mr. Hsu Ti-Shan
Mr. N.C. Sen
Professor S.N. Pherwani
Mr. Mountford Mills
Mr. Ruhi Afnan
The Venerable Archdeacon Williams
Mr. Richard St. Barbe Baker
Mr. Albert Thoka
Mr. L.W.G. Malcom
Professor J. Arthur Thomson
Mr. Victor Branford
Professor H.J. Fleure
Rachel Annand Taylor
Mr. Christopher Dawson
Mr. William Loftus Hare
Professor Patrick Geddes
Reverend Tyssul Davies

References 

British Empire Exhibition
Entertainment lists
Culture-related timelines
1924 in religion
1924 in London
Religion in London